Wafaa Bloc was a candidature list that contested the May 2005 municipal elections in Bethlehem, the West Bank. The list was officially supported by the Islamic Jihad Movement in Palestine. In total, the Bloc presented 4 candidates. The top candidate of the Bloc was Nasser Isa Hassan Shauka.

References

External links
Candidate List 
Election Programme 
Bethlehem municipal election blocs
Defunct political party alliances in the Palestinian territories
Islamic Jihad Movement in Palestine